The Cabinet of the Democratic Republic of the Congo is chaired by the Prime Minister of the Democratic Republic of the Congo.

Cabinets 

 Adolphe Muzito cabinet
 Antoine Gizenga cabinet
 Lukonde cabinet
 Lumumba Government
 Ilunga government

References 

 
Politics of the Democratic Republic of the Congo
Government of the Democratic Republic of the Congo
DRC, Cabinet